Forever You is the 6th album of Zard and was released on March 10, 1995 under B-Gram Records label.

Background
The album consist of three previously released tracks.

For first time ZARD self-covered song Hitomi ni Sorasanaide which was originally performed by a Being artist Deen.

Charting performance
The album charted #1 rank in Oricon first week. It charted for 35 weeks and sold more than 1,774,000 copies.

Track listing
All lyrics written by Izumi Sakai.

Usage in media
Konnani Soba ni Iru no ni: commercial song of "Boutique joy"
Anata wo Kanjiteitai: commercial song of NTT DoCoMo
Just believe in love: theme song for Tokyo Broadcasting System Television drama "Yureru Omoi"
High Heel Nugi Sutete: ending theme for Fuji TV program "OIOI Tokyo Style Room's"

References 

Zard albums
1995 albums
Being Inc. albums
Japanese-language albums

Chart positions
{| class="wikitable"
!Year
!Album
!Chart
!Position
!First week sales
!Weeks
!Annual Sales
!Yearly Position
|-
|1995
|Forever you
|Japanese Oricon Weekly Albums Chart (Top 100)
|1
|620,460
|35
|1,773,930
|4